Todd Eric Edelman (born January 16, 1968) is an American lawyer serving as an associate judge for the Superior Court of the District of Columbia. He is a nominee to be a United States district judge of the United States District Court for the District of Columbia.

Early life and education

Edelman was born in 1968, in St. Louis, Missouri. He received a Bachelor of Arts degree, cum laude, in 1990 from Yale University. He received a Juris Doctor, cum laude, in 1994 from the New York University School of Law.

Career 
Edelman began his legal career as a law clerk to Judge William B. Bryant of the United States District Court for the District of Columbia, from 1994 to 1995. From 1995 to 1997, he was an E. Barrett Prettyman Fellow at Georgetown University Law Center. He worked for the Public Defender Service for the District of Columbia from 1997 to 2005, during which time he served as a staff attorney for the Trial Division from 1997 to 2001, a supervising attorney for the Trial Division from 2001 to 2002, the chief of the Serious Felony Section from 2002 to 2004, and the training director from 2004 to 2005. From 2005 to 2008, he was of counsel at the law firm Bredhoff & Kaiser, P.L.L.C. in Washington, D.C. From 2008 to 2010, he was a visiting associate professor of law at the Georgetown University Law Center. He has served as an associate judge on the Superior Court of the District of Columbia, since 2010.

Notable cases 
In 2020, Edelman presided over the trial of Christian Wingfield on charges of illegal possession of a firearm by a felon.  Edelman released Wingfield with an ankle monitor instead of keeping him in jail during the trial.  Shortly after his release, Wingfield was involved in the murder of a 10-year-old boy, Davon McNeal, on July 4, 2020, while attending a "stop-the-violence" cookout.  Winfield subsequently pleaded guilty of involuntary manslaughter.

Expired nomination to the U.S. district court 
On April 28, 2016, President Barack Obama nominated Edelman to serve as a United States District Judge of the United States District Court for the District of Columbia, to the seat vacated by Judge Richard W. Roberts, who retired on March 16, 2016. His nomination expired on January 3, 2017, with the end of the 114th Congress.

Renomination to U.S. district court under Biden 
On July 29, 2022, President Joe Biden announced his intent to nominate Edelman to serve as a United States district judge of the United States District Court for the District of Columbia. On September 27, 2022, his nomination was sent to the Senate. President Biden nominated Edelman to the seat vacated by Judge Florence Y. Pan, who was elevated to the United States Court of Appeals for the District of Columbia Circuit. On November 15, 2022, a hearing on his nomination was held before the Senate Judiciary Committee. Republicans fiercely criticized Edelman as pro-criminal and anti public safety. In particular, they attacked his handling of the trial of Christian Wingfield.  Edelman released Wingfield before trial with an ankle monitor.  Shortly after his release, Wingfield was involved in the murder of a 10-year-old boy at a July 4, 2020 cookout. " A child is dead because Judge Edelman didn’t do his job, and now he wants a promotion," said Senator Marsha Blackburn after the hearing. Senator Tom Cotton remarked, ""Crime in DC and around the country is skyrocketing, no thanks to lenient, liberal judges like Judge Edelman." On January 3, 2023, his nomination was returned to the President under Rule XXXI, Paragraph 6 of the United States Senate. He was renominated on January 23, 2023. On February 9, 2023, his nomination was reported out of committee by an 11–10 vote. His nomination is pending before the United States Senate.

References

1968 births
Living people
21st-century American judges
Georgetown University Law Center faculty
Judges of the Superior Court of the District of Columbia
Lawyers from St. Louis
New York University School of Law alumni
Public defenders
Yale University alumni